Smarżowa  is a village in the administrative district of Gmina Brzostek, within Dębica County, Subcarpathian Voivodeship, in south-eastern Poland.

The village has a population of 650.

18 February 1846 - beginning of the Galician peasant revolt. The massacre, led by Jakub Szela (born in Smarżowa), is also known as the Galician Massacre, and began on 18 February 1846. This led to the "Galician Slaughter," in which many nobles and their families were murdered by peasants. Szela units surrounded and attacked manor houses and settlements located in three counties - Sanok, Jasło and Tarnów. The revolt got out of hand and the Austrians had to put it down.

References

Villages in Dębica County